This should not be confused with the Indian state Kerala.
 
Kerela is a small town and commune in the Cercle of Dioila in the Koulikoro Region of southern Mali. In 1998 the commune had a population of 10,268.

References

Communes of Koulikoro Region